Antonieta Rosa Gomes (born May 4, 1959, in Bissau) is a Bissau-Guinean politician.

Founder and leader of the Guinean Civic Forum–Social Democracy, Gomes was educated in Brazil, receiving her law degree from the University of São Paulo. She served under Kumba Ialá as the Minister of Justice and the Minister of Foreign Affairs at various points. She stood as a candidate in the presidential elections of 1994, 1999, and 2005, the first and only woman to do so, but never received more than 2% of the vote. Her ouster as Minister of Foreign Affairs is considered a major factor in the events leading to the 2003 coup d'état which ousted Ialá from power. In 2004 she served as president of the commission of the Supreme Tribunal of Justice. She ran for president in 2005 on the FCG ticket with the affiliation with Social Democracy. She was only the women in the elections. The Fórum Cívico Guineense-Social Democracia no longer appeared in the parliamentary elections on November 16, 2008, and April 13, 2014. She also refrained from renewed candidacy in the presidential elections on June 28, 2009, March 18, 2012, and April 13, 2014.

References

1959 births
Living people
Foreign Ministers of Guinea-Bissau
Female foreign ministers
University of São Paulo alumni
20th-century women politicians
21st-century women politicians
Women government ministers of Guinea-Bissau
Bissau-Guinean women diplomats
Bissau-Guinean diplomats
Female justice ministers